Oleg Troshin (born 1 August 1964) is a Soviet racewalker. He competed in the men's 20 kilometres walk at the 1992 Summer Olympics, representing the Unified Team.

References

1964 births
Living people
Place of birth missing (living people)
Soviet male racewalkers
Olympic male racewalkers
Olympic athletes of the Unified Team
Athletes (track and field) at the 1992 Summer Olympics
Russian Athletics Championships winners